Tirawley (Irish: Tír Amhlaidh), archaically known as Tyrawley, is a barony extending southward from the north coast of County Mayo, Ireland. It was created during the shiring of County Mayo out of the Gaelic túath or territory of Tír Amhlaidh, from which it takes its name.

The title Baron Tyrawley was created twice, in 1706 and 1797.
The nineteenth century writer Caesar Otway wrote 'Sketches of Erris and Tyrawley' a sometimes amusing and always interesting account of life in North Mayo just prior to the devastating Irish Famine of 1845 - 47.

Downpatrick Head and the Ceide Fields are located on the north coast of the Barony.  The historical town of Killala is on its east coast where it looks across the bay at Enniscrone, Co. Sligo.

The barony of Tirawley includes
 Ballina
 Moygownagh
 Killala
 Crossmolina
 Pontoon, County Mayo
 Ceide Fields
 Ballycastle
 Belderrig

Annalistic references
 U913.6. Niall son of Aed led an expedition to Connacht and inflicted a battle-rout on the warriors of the north of Connacht, i.e. on the Uí Amalgada and the men of Umall, and they left behind a very large number either dead or captured, including Mael Cluiche son of Conchobor.
 M1205.2.Donat O'Beacdha, Bishop of Tyrawley, died.
 M1206.11. Rory O'Toghda, Chief of Bredagh in Hy-Awley Tirawley, died.
 M1207.9. Cathal Carragh, son of Dermot, who was son of Teige O'Mulrony, took a great prey from Cormac, son of Tomaltagh Mac Dermot, and O'Flynn of the Cataract, but was overtaken by some of the Connacians, namely, Dermot, son of Manus, who was son of Murtough O'Conor; Cormac, son of Tomaltagh; Conor God O'Hara, Lord of Leyny; and Donough O'Dowda, Lord of Tirawley and Tireragh; and a battle ensued, in which Cathal Carragh was defeated. He was taken prisoner, and blinded; and his son, Maurice, with the son of Cugranna O'Flanagan, and many others, were killed (in the battle).
 M1460.1. The monastery of Maighin in Tirawley, in the diocese of Killala, in Connaught, was founded by Mac William Burke, at the request of Nehemias O'Donohoe, the first Irish provincial vicar of the order of St. Francis de Observantia.
 M1463.8. The son of Main Barrett, Lord of Tirawley, and Siacus Cam, the son of Farrell, Lord of the Clann-Auliffe O'Farrell, died`

See also
 Baronies of Ireland

References

Baronies of County Mayo